is a Japanese hurdler. He competed in the men's 110 metres hurdles at the 1964 Summer Olympics.

References

1942 births
Living people
Place of birth missing (living people)
Japanese male hurdlers
Olympic male hurdlers
Olympic athletes of Japan
Athletes (track and field) at the 1964 Summer Olympics
Japan Championships in Athletics winners